The  Denver Broncos season was the team's 29th year in professional football and its 19th with the National Football League (NFL). The team tried to win its third consecutive AFC title, but went 8–8 and missed the playoffs for the second time in six seasons.

Off Season

NFL draft

Personnel

Staff

Roster

Schedule

Game summaries

Week 9 at Colts

Week 16

Standings

References

External links
Denver Broncos – 1988 media guide
 1988 Denver Broncos at Pro-Football-Reference.com

Denver Broncos
Denver Broncos seasons
Denver Bronco